The James River is a river in the U.S. state of Virginia.

James River may also refer to:

Rivers:
 James River (Alberta), in Canada
 James River (Dakotas), in North & South Dakota, United States
 James River (Missouri), in the United States
 James River (Texas), in the United States

Places:
 James River, Nova Scotia, a rural community in Nova Scotia, Canada

Other:
 James River, the working title of American recording artist D'Angelo's third studio album, later retitled Black Messiah
 James River (train), a former Amtrak passenger train along Virginia's James River
 "James River", a song by Merle Kilgore
 James River Corporation, a former paper company

See also 
 James River Correctional Center, in Goochland County, Virginia
 James River Elementary School (Williamsburg, Virginia)
 James River High School (disambiguation), three such schools in Virginia
 , more than one United States Navy ship
 James River Bridge
 James (disambiguation)
 James Lake (disambiguation)